Komal Rizvi (born 3 August 1981) is a Pakistani actress, singer, songwriter, and a television host.  She is famous for her songs in Coke Studio (Pakistan).

Early life
Rizvi was born in Dubai and then raised in England and Nigeria. As a teenager, she came to Pakistan and launched her career in Karachi where she was also a student.

She started her career at age 16 when her talent was spotted by a family friend of her brother Hasan Rizvi, who is a dancer and an entrepreneur and also performed with Komal at various fashion events.

She released her first song in 1999 which went on to become the super hit Punjabi bhangra song "Bauji bauji bhangra saaday naal paoji". She became an overnight sensation.

She often writes the lyrics of her own songs.

Komal recently started her own safe skincare brand by the name of Truly Komal. Truly Komal is Pakistan's first line of Safe skincare products. Komal Rizvi along with top notch chemist from Canada has developed her own skincare formulas which are all made in SPAIN! With over 30 products available instore and online, Truly Komal is reshaping the landscape of beauty industry in Pakistan.

Personal life 
In April 2021, Komal Rizvi opens up about her abusive marriage and divorce. She said that shifted to Oman after her marriage and was treated badly by her husband. She further stated that her husband was mentally ill and he would raise his hand against her. She finally got divorced in 2019.

Career

Acting 
Rizvi's first screen role was for Pakistan Television (PTV), the super hit Hawain in 1997, followed by Lehrein. TV serials like Kabhi Kabhi, Teesra Peher and Samandar Hai Darmiyan helped establish her as one of the leading actresses of the Pakistani television industry. She received a lot of praise for her role in Hum TV's Mujhay Roothnay Na Daina.

Despite the critical acclaim she has received for her acting, Rizvi is very selective about her acting projects as she tries to maintain her main focus on singing. "There are a few things that I look at before accepting a role. The major thing is the script and the production team. I accept only if the script is strong, realistic and relatable. I don't accept to act if the part I am going to play and the script are not good enough," Rizvi said in an interview given to You! Magazine.

In September 2016, it was reported that Rizvi would star in a Hollywood movie under the banner of a Canadian production house. This  new film, named Afreen, was scheduled to be released in 2017. Rizvi said in a newspaper interview, about the film's subject and plot, "It's an anti-ISIS and a pro-Muslim film".

Television show hosting 
Rizvi started her TV hosting career with Karachi Nights With Komal. The highlight of her hosting career remains the TV show she did for Hum in Pakistan where she hosted Hum TV Mornings With Komal and Nachley, and the popular dance reality show for ARY.

Singing 
Rizvi was a part of Coke Studio's third season where she performed "Daaneh Pe Daanah" with folk singer Akhtar Chanal Zahri. Originally written and composed by Zahri himself, the song fondly sings the praises of the province Balochistan he hails from. Presenting an unconventional alliance, this Coke Studio rendition of the popular folk song fused with Sindhi Sufi classic "Lal Meri Path" took both well-loved anthems to a new level in 2011.
Reborn against the backdrop of a modern funk groove, the song became a colorful musical demonstration of diversity with Zahri and Rizvi, two strong yet vastly different personalities, combining their voices in a symbolic celebration of individuality.

Rizvi also performed "Lambi Judaai", a classic Reshma number. Reshma caused a stir across the border when "Lambi Judaai" from the soundtrack of 1983 Bollywood film Hero became a massive hit. Coke Studio presented the nostalgic melody against a fluid backdrop of rich chordal elements to take on the quality of a ballad from the 1950s.
Both the numbers were featured on the Top 10 all-time hits of Coke Studio. Rizvi is the only female singer to be featured twice on that list.

She has performed many old Punjabi songs.

Filmography

Drama serials

References

External links 
 
 

1981 births
Living people
Pakistani television actresses
Pakistani television hosts
VJ (video performance artists)
Pakistani Muslims
20th-century Pakistani actresses
21st-century Pakistani actresses
21st-century Pakistani women singers
Actresses from Karachi
Singers from Karachi
People from Karachi
Pakistani women television presenters